VBG may refer to:

Vandenberg Air Force Base, California, USA
Verkehrsbetriebe Glattal, European bus operator 
Vogtlandbahn, German railway company
Vertical banded gastroplasty, also known as "stomach stapling"
Team Vorarlberg, Austrian cycling team
Volume Bragg grating, a holographic optical element